The 2014 Paris Mondial de l'Automobile or 2014 Paris Motor Show took place from 4 October to 19 October 2014 on 'Automobile and Fashion' theme.

Introductions

Production cars

 Audi A1 facelift
 Audi A6 facelift
 Audi TT Roadster
 Audi R8
 Bentley Mulsanne Speed
 BMW 2 Series Convertible
 BMW 7 Series Final Edition
 2015 BMW X6
 Chevrolet Captiva Facelift
 Ferrari 458M Turbo
 Ferrari 458 Speciale A
 Fiat 500X 
 Ford C-Max Facelift
 Ford S-Max
 Honda Civic facelift 
 Honda HR-V
 Hyundai i20 European Debut
 Infiniti Q70 
 Jaguar XE
 Kia Sorento
 Land Rover Discovery Sport
 Mazda 2
 Mazda MX-5 Miata 
 Mercedes-Benz AMG GT
 Mercedes-Benz B-Class Facelift
 Nissan Pulsar
 Opel Corsa E
 Peugeot 208 GTi 30th Anniversary Edition
 Peugeot 308 GT
 Porsche Cayenne PHEV
 Renault Espace 
 Škoda Fabia
 Smart Forfour
 Smart Fortwo
 SsangYong XIV 
 Suzuki Vitara
 Volkswagen GL Sport
 Volkswagen Golf Alltrack
 Volkswagen Passat GTE
 Volkswagen Polo GTI
 Volvo XC90

Concept cars

 Audi TT SportBack
 Citroën C4 Cactus Airflow 2L
 Citroën DS Divine
 Infiniti Q80
 Mitsubishi Outlander PHEV 
 Renault Eolab
 Peugeot Exalt 
 Toyota C-HR
 Lamborghini Asterion LPI 910-4

Motorsport cars

 Citroën DS3 WRC
 Hyundai i20 WRC 
 Mitsubishi Outlander PHEV for Australasian Safari
 Peugeot 208 WRC
 Peugeot 208 WRC-2
 Peugeot 208 WRX FIA European Rallycross Championship
 Volkswagen Polo R WRC (European Debut)

Exhibitors

 Abarth
 Alfa Romeo
 Aston Martin
 Audi
 Bentley
 BMW
 Citroën
 Comarth
 Courb
 Dacia
 Dangel
 DS
 Eon Motors
 Ferrari
 Fiat
 Ford
 Honda
 Hyundai
 Infiniti
 Isuzu
 Jaguar
 Jeep
 Kia
 Lamborghini
 Lancia
 Land Rover
 Lexus
 Ligier
 Maserati
 Mazda
 Mega
 Mercedes-Benz
 Microcar
 Mini
 Mitsubishi
 Nissan
 Opel
 Peugeot
 PGO
 Porsche
 Renault
 Rolls-Royce
 Seat
 Škoda Auto
 Smart
 SsangYong
 Subaru
 Suzuki
 Tesla Motors
 Toyota
 Venturi
 Volkswagen
 Volvo

The Automobile and Fashion Exhibition
The 2014 Paris Motor Show will be based on the 'Automobile and Fashion' theme. Around 40 cars will be the part of exhibition in partnership with INA at Pavilion 8. All these cars will be from the year before 1900 to the current year and that includes pre-war, post-war, art years and environment-friendly customization of the contemporary era as well.

Electric and Hybrid Vehicle Testing Center
The 2014 Paris Motor Show will host an event for the testing of electric and hybrid vehicle testing at the pavilion 2/1. This will be the first time that the live testing for the visitor will be done at an automobile event. The car manufacturers like BMW, Courb, Eon, Kia, Nissan, Mercedes, Renault and other will be participating in the testing.

References

External links

Paris Motor Show 2014
Official web site

Auto shows in France
October 2014 events in France
Motor Show
Paris Motor Show